Alison Bai and Zoe Hives were the defending champions, but lost in the semifinals to Eri Hozumi and Risa Ozaki.

Ellen Perez and Arina Rodionova won the title, defeating Hozumi and Ozaki in the final, 7–5, 6–1.

Seeds

Draw

Draw

References
Main Draw

Bendigo Women's International - Doubles